Greatest Disco Hits: Music for Non-Stop Dancing  is an album released by the Salsoul Orchestra in 1978 on Salsoul Records (LP record SA 8508). It is noted for its pioneering use of slip-cueing, known at the time as “disco blending,” a phrase coined by Walter Gibbons.

Reception
Prior to landing on the charts, the album had been reviewed as a “perfect party record” by Billboard magazine. Greatest Disco Hits entered the Billboard 200 album charts on September 9, 1978, and remained there for 13 weeks; it peaked at #97 and was the group's last album to break the top 100.

Track listing 
All tracks written by Vincent Montana Jr. except where noted.

 "Salsoul: 3001 [Introduction]" (adapted by Montana from Also sprach Zarathustra by Richard Strauss)
 "Nice ‘n' Naasty"
 "Getaway" (Peter Cor, Beloyd Taylor)
 "You're Just the Right Size"
 "Chicago Bus Stop (Ooh, I Love It)"
 "Tangerine" (Johnny Mercer, Victor Schertzinger)
 "Salsoul Hustle"
 "Magic Bird of Fire"
 "It's Good for the Soul"
 "Salsoul Rainbow"
 "Don’t Beat Around the Bush"
 "Salsoul: 3001" (adapted by Montana from Also sprach Zarathustra by Richard Strauss)

References

1978 albums
Salsoul Orchestra albums